Imre Taussig (28 June 1894 – 23 March 1945) was a Hungarian international footballer who played as a forward right winger. Taussig, who was Jewish, played club football for MTK for his entire career, winning three titles, and also represented Hungarian national team at the international level, earning 5 caps between 1914 and 1918.

Professional

Clubs
Taussig began his football career when he signed with MTK Budapest FC in 1907.  He was 13 at the time.

National team
Taussig earned 5 caps with the Hungary national football team between 1914 and 1918.

Personal
During the World War 2 he was in Bruck an der Leitha Camp, Austria. Imre, then 50 years old was murdered in March 1945 in Bruck an der Leitha Camp, Austria. This information is based on a list of murdered persons found in M.34.1 – Yad Vashem research.

Honours
Nemzeti Bajnokság I (3): 1913–14, 1916–17, 1919–20
Magyar Kupa (1): 1914

References 

 Yad Vashem Info
 Antal Zoltán – Hoffer József: Alberttől Zsákig, Budapest, Sportkiadó, 1968
 Rejtő László – Lukács László – Szepesi György: Felejthetetlen 90 percek, Budapest, Sportkiadó, 1977, 

1894 births
1945 deaths
Hungarian Jews
Jewish footballers
Hungarian footballers
Hungary international footballers
MTK Budapest FC players
Hungarian civilians killed in World War II
Association football forwards
Hungarian Jews who died in the Holocaust
Jewish Hungarian sportspeople